James C. Liao is the Parsons Foundation Professor and Chair of the Department of Chemical and Biomolecular Engineering at the University of California, Los Angeles and is the co-founder and lead scientific advisor of Easel Biotechnologies, LLC.

He is best known for his work in metabolic engineering, synthetic biology, and bioenergy. Liao has been recognized for the biosynthesis and production of higher alcohols such as isobutanol from sugars, cellulose, waste protein, or carbon dioxide.

He was named the president of Academia Sinica, Taiwan, in June 2016.

Education and training
Liao holds both Taiwanese and American citizenship. After receiving his bachelor's degree from National Taiwan University in 1980, Liao earned his doctor of philosophy from University of Wisconsin–Madison in 1987 under the guidance of Edwin N. Lightfoot, co-author of Transport Phenomena. He worked as a research scientist for Eastman Kodak from 1987 to 1989. In 1990, he joined the Department of Chemical Engineering at Texas A&M University as an assistant professor and three years later he became an associate professor. In 1997, Liao became a professor for the Department of Chemical and Biomolecular Engineering at University of California, Los Angeles.

Research
Liao's research interests include biological synthesis of fuels and chemicals, carbon and nitrogen assimilation, metabolic engineering and synthetic biology, transcriptional and metabolic networks analysis, fatty acid metabolism.

Protein based biofuels 
Liao and his team are researching protein based biofuels which use proteins, rather than fats or carbohydrates, as a significant raw material for biorefining and biofuel production. The benefit of using protein is that the protein metabolism is much faster than fatty acid metabolism such as  algae biofuels, which leads to higher production.

Electrofuels 
Liao's lab recently participated in the US Department of Energy's Electrofuels program. They proposed converting solar energy into liquid fuels such as isobutanol. A new bioreactor could store electricity as liquid fuel with the help of a genetically engineered microbes and carbon dioxide. The isobutanol produced would have an energy density close to gasoline.

Non-oxidative glycolysis 
Liao has also worked on the creation of a non-oxidative glycolysis pathway. The Liao laboratory has developed a pathway, called Non-oxidative glycolysis (NOG), that allows 100% carbon conservation in various fermentation processes.

Awards and honors
Samson-Prime Minister's Prize for Innovation in Alternative Energy and Smart Mobility for Transportation, Israel, 2020
Elected to The World Academy of Sciences 2019
Elected to National Academy of Sciences 2015 
Elected Academician of Academia Sinica
Industrial Application of Science from National Academy of Sciences 2014 
Elected to National Academy of Engineering 2013
ENI award for Renewable Energy 2013
White House Champion of Change in Renewable Energy, 2012
Presidential Green Chemistry Award from EPA 2010
James E. Bailey Award, Society for Biological Engineering, 2009
Alpha Chi Sigma Award, American Institute of Chemical Engineers, 2009
Marvin J. Johnson Award, Biochemical Technology Division, American Chemical Society, 2009
Charles Thom Award, Society for Industrial Microbiology, 2008
Merck Award for Metabolic Engineering, 2006
FPBE Division Award of American Institute of Chemical Engineers, 2006
Fellow, American Institute for Medical and Biological Engineering, 2002 
National Science Foundation Young Investigator Award, 1992

Personal
Liao is originally from Taiwan. He is married to Kelly Liao and has two daughters, Carol and Clara Liao.

References

External links
James C. Liao, President of Academia Sinica 
White House Champion of Change for Renewable Energy - James Liao
James C. Liao, Metabolic Engineering and Synthetic Biology Laboratory Homepage

Living people
University of Wisconsin–Madison alumni
National Taiwan University alumni
UCLA Henry Samueli School of Engineering and Applied Science faculty
Taiwanese chemical engineers
Members of Academia Sinica
Members of the United States National Academy of Sciences
Fellows of the American Institute for Medical and Biological Engineering
Synthetic biologists
Members of the United States National Academy of Engineering
Year of birth missing (living people)
American biomedical engineers
TWAS fellows